Sir Mayur Keshavji Lakhani  (born 20 April 1960) is a British doctor who works as a general practitioner. He was Chairman of The National Council for Palliative Care 2008–2015. He was Chairman of the Royal College of General Practitioners (RCGP) from 2004 to 2007. He took up the office of President of the RCGP in November 2017.

Early life

Lakhani was born in 1960 in East Africa to parents of Indian origin. 

He moved to the UK with his family in 1972 and went to school in Leicester. He studied at the University of Dundee, graduating with a medical degree in 1983. He initially worked in Scotland and Cambridge before returning to Leicester. Since qualifying as a GP in 1991 he has worked at Highgate Medical Centre in Sileby.

By 2014, he was spending 3 days a week there.

Career
Lakhani was appointed Chairman of RCGP in 2004, and remained in the position until 2007 when Steve Field took over. He in a nationally elected member of Council of RCGP.

He was appointed Chairman of The National Council for Palliative Care in 2008, succeeding Francis Plowden, then stepping down in 2015, once he had reached the maximum limit of seven years in the post.

He is a member of the Faculty of Medical Leadership and Management (FMLM). He is an honorary member of the University of Leicester. He is Chairman of West Leicestershire CCG.

In 2015, he stood as a candidate for the position of President of the RCGP. He stood again in 2017 and was elected as president, to take up office in November 2017 for a two-year term.

Honours
Lakhani was appointed Commander of the Order of the British Empire (CBE) in the 2007 Birthday Honours for services to medicine and was knighted in the 2023 New Year Honours for services to general practice.

References

External links

Living people
Alumni of the University of Dundee
21st-century British medical doctors
British general practitioners
British Ismailis
Knights Bachelor
Commanders of the Order of the British Empire
Fellows of the Royal College of General Practitioners
Fellows of the Royal College of Physicians
Place of birth missing (living people)
1960 births
People from Leicester
Naturalised citizens of the United Kingdom
English people of Indian descent